IUPUI University Library is the university library of Indiana University–Purdue University Indianapolis. IUPUI is an urban campus of Indiana University and Purdue University in Indianapolis, Indiana. Indiana University is the managing partner.

Facilities
Designed by Edward Larrabee Barnes and constructed at a cost of $32 million, the IUPUI University Library officially opened in its current location on April 8, 1994. With nearly a million patron visits a year, plus staff and resources that support all of IUPUI's more than 200 degree programs, the IUPUI University Library is a public academic research library.

Serving as a centerpiece for the IUPUI library system, the University Library provides academic and community patrons with wide variety of study and learning spaces. The five-story facility houses hundreds of study carrels, group study rooms, multimedia classrooms, a 100-seat auditorium, and the Academic Commons—a flexible group study area equipped with leading-edge computer and multimedia technology.

Collection
The library's holdings include more than 1,338,889 volumes, 36,000 current periodicals and journals, 1.197 million microforms, and 152,400 government documents and audiovisual materials. Services are available to university students, faculty and staff, as well as individual citizens, businesses, professional firms, and public agencies. The library’s holdings are accessed through a computer network linking Indiana University libraries statewide, and an interlibrary loan system makes available additional local, state, and national academic library resources.

The University Library's Joseph and Matthew Payton Philanthropic Studies Library is a collection for study and research on philanthropy and nonprofit organizations. Research materials include books, audio and video materials, specialized periodicals in the field, and dissertations. The collection contains works from all disciplines as they relate to aspects of voluntary action.

The University Library is also home to the Ruth Lilly Special Collections and Archives which holds the IUPUI University Archives, Philanthropy Archives, and the manuscript collections for the study of German-Americana. The Philanthropy Archives contains primary resources for research that include the historical records of organizations and individuals that have worked as advocates for the nonprofit sector, fund raising firms that help nonprofit organizations raise money, foundations and individual philanthropists, organizations devoted to the study of philanthropy, and nonprofit organizations that provide social services, particularly in central Indiana.

Herron Art Library
The Herron Art Library supporting the Herron School of Art and Design at IUPUI is a satellite of the University Library. Through individual donations, the Herron Art Library has developed a museum-caliber collection of 400 artist's books. Drawing from a wide range of media, artists’ books are works of art that are sometimes realized in the form of a book, but not always.

Online Resources
With various national and local partners, the IUPUI University Library has created over 40 digital libraries and on-line resources.

References

External links

James Whitcomb Riley Collection Homepage 
Ruth Lilly Special Collections and Archives Homepage
Joseph & Matthew Payton Philanthropic Studies Library 

Library buildings completed in 1994
University and college academic libraries in the United States
Libraries in Indiana
Buildings and structures in Indianapolis
Indiana University–Purdue University Indianapolis
1994 establishments in Indiana